Felipe Da Sousa Gomes (born 26 April 1986) is a Paralympic athlete from Brazil. He mainly competes in category T11 sprint events. At the 2012 Summer Paralympics in London he took the gold in the T11 200m sprint.

Career history
Gomes first competed in a Summer Paralympics in 2008 when he attended the games in Beijing. There he reached the finals of the 100m finishing eighth and although qualifying past the first round of the 200m he did not start the semi-finals due to injury. He was also part of the men's 4 × 100 m relay, though the team was disqualified in their first heat, and although scheduled to participate in the triple jump his injury forced him to retire before the event began. Four years later Gomes was reselected for Brazil when he competed in the 2012 Summer Paralympics in London. There he entered both the 100m and 200m T11 sprint events. He took bronze in the 100m and gold in the 200m.

In 2013, Gomes again represented Brazil when he attended the IPC Athletics World Championships in Lyon, France. There he entered the 100m sprint, finishing second to take the silver medal.

Notes

External links
 

1986 births
Living people
Brazilian male sprinters
Paralympic athletes of Brazil
Paralympic gold medalists for Brazil
Paralympic silver medalists for Brazil
Paralympic bronze medalists for Brazil
Paralympic medalists in athletics (track and field)
Athletes (track and field) at the 2008 Summer Paralympics
Athletes (track and field) at the 2012 Summer Paralympics
Athletes (track and field) at the 2016 Summer Paralympics
Medalists at the 2012 Summer Paralympics
Medalists at the 2016 Summer Paralympics
Medalists at the 2007 Parapan American Games
Medalists at the 2015 Parapan American Games
Medalists at the 2019 Parapan American Games
Athletes from Rio de Janeiro (city)
Athletes (track and field) at the 2020 Summer Paralympics
21st-century Brazilian people